Ismael Shah Al-Zadah (born 26 October 1962) is a Kuwaiti handball player. He competed at the 1980 Summer Olympics and the 1996 Summer Olympics.

References

External links
 

1962 births
Living people
Kuwaiti male handball players
Olympic handball players of Kuwait
Handball players at the 1980 Summer Olympics
Handball players at the 1996 Summer Olympics
Place of birth missing (living people)